Alexander Tsymbalyuk is a Ukrainian bass opera singer, a member of the Hamburg State Opera. He made his debut with The Royal Opera for the 2013/14 season, singing the Commendatore in Don Giovanni.

Repertoire
 Don Giovanni, Commendatore
 Rigoletto, Sparafucile

References

External links
 Alexander Tsymbalyuk's management page Askonas Holt

Living people
21st-century Ukrainian male opera singers
Operatic bass-baritones
Year of birth missing (living people)